Didling is a small village in the Chichester district of West Sussex, England. It lies on the Treyford to Bepton road 3.5 miles (5.7 km) south-west of Midhurst. It is in the civil parish of Elsted and Treyford.

Church
The c.13th century church of St Andrew, known as "The Shepherds' Church", sits a little to the south of the village on the northern slope of Didling Hill. The nave and chancel are of plastered rubble with ashlar dressings. The wooden porch is modern. The church has a single bell dated 1587. The church is known for its simplicity and the fact that it has survived the intervening centuries with very little restoration, with that which has taken place having been sympathetic. Without an electricity supply the church is lit by candles.

References

External links

  Gravelroots Guide to Didling with large photo album of St. Andrewspart of the Rother Valley Guide
  Church of St. Andrew

Villages in West Sussex